Pennsylvania Station is a name applied by the Pennsylvania Railroad to several of its grand passenger terminals.

Pennsylvania Station or Penn Station may also refer to

Current train stations 
 Baltimore Penn Station
 Pennsylvania Station (Cincinnati)
 Pennsylvania Station (New York City)
 Pennsylvania Station (1910–1963), the predecessor to the present New York City station
 Pennsylvania Station (Newark)

Train stations formerly called Pennsylvania Station
 30th Street Station, Philadelphia, formerly Pennsylvania Station–30th Street
 Harrisburg Transportation Center, formerly Pennsylvania Station, Harrisburg
 Union Station (Pittsburgh), or Pennsylvania Station
 Wilmington station (Delaware), formerly Pennsylvania Station 1907–2011
 Pennsylvania Station (Cleveland) 1946–1953

Subway stations 
 34th Street–Penn Station (IND Eighth Avenue Line), a New York City Subway station (A, C, E trains)
 34th Street–Penn Station (IRT Broadway–Seventh Avenue Line), a New York City Subway station (1, 2, 3 trains)

Other uses
 Penn Station (restaurant), a restaurant chain

See also

 Penn Center Station, former name of Suburban station, Philadelphia 
 Penn Medicine station, in Philadelphia
 Penn Street station, in Clifton Heights, Pennsylvania